The Polytechnic University of the Philippines Student Council (PUP SC) (Filipino: Konseho ng Mag-aaral ng Politeknikong Unibersidad ng Pilipinas) is the official undergraduate student union and collective student representative body of the Polytechnic University of the Philippines Manila campuses. It represents the interests of the students on the university, national, and global issues.

As the collective student representation in the university, the central and college student councils are composed of members elected amongst the student body, mandated to organize and direct campaigns and activities to defend and promote students’ rights, and improve the students’ general welfare. Furthermore, it provides direct services to the student body.

The PUP Student Council is composed of the Central Student Council (Sentral na Konseho ng Mag-aaral; SKM), student councils in various colleges, Commission on Student Organization and Accreditation (COSOA), Commission on Audit (COA), Commission on Election (COMELEC), and the Student Tribunal (ST); wherein four high-ranking officers of the Central Student Council and the presidents of college student councils form the Student Council Assembly (SCA), the highest policy-making body of the student council.

History and advocacies
In 1969, then-Philippine College of Commerce (PCC) President Nemesio Prudente included the student council in the board of trustees of the college.

In 1972, the student council was abolished due to the proclamation of martial law. Five years after the PCC was converted into a chartered state university and renamed Polytechnic University of the Philippines (PUP), the student council was eventually revived in 1983 with its constitution and by-laws being drafted and ratified.

In 1990, Prudente, who was reappointed as PUP president, assigned the student union hall (now called Charlie del Rosario Building) and certain rooms in the main academic building to the Central Student Council, accredited student organizations, cultural groups, and major student publications.

PUP SPEAK (2016 - 2021) 
From 2016 to 2021, the Students' Party for Equality and Advancement of Knowledge (SPEAK) had been the ruling political party of the PUP Student Council.

In July 2019, ahead of the fourth State of the Nation Address of President Rodrigo Duterte, the College of Communication Student Council (COC SC) was among the youth groups invited to Rappler's MovePH Huddle to discuss on several issues. On the youth sector's efforts to campaign for a coal-free Negros, COC SC's Neilvin John Aventurado shared that "the government should be listening or they should be aiming for the protection of our environment and the people who benefit from it" after expressing sadness by the fact that the youth had to conduct protests just to be heard.

In February 2020, the Central Student Council, together with various organization under the leadership of PUP Office of the Student Regent (OSR) held a benefit concert on the university oval grounds to support the mid-to-long-term rehabilitation of the communities affected by the Taal volcano eruption. The concert, which was attended by over 15,000 people, was headlined by Parokya ni Edgar, Itchyworms, Gloc-9, and Rocksteddy.

In April 2020, the Central Student Council joined in decrying the detention of Rexon Aumentado, a mechanical engineering department and community volunteer, over alleged violations of the enhanced community quarantine. Joining the call to release the student were human rights lawyers Chel Diokno and Erin Tanada, who called the arrest a form of "harassment".

In April 2021, the College of Accountancy and Finance Student Council (CAF SC) urged the university to extend the "academic break" from April 5 to April 11 amidst rising COVID-19 cases. It insisted that the students and the professors are "not mentally and practically ready to start the new semester,” as it also pointed out that they were immobilized due to the extended community quarantine and its border restrictions.

In January 2021, the Central Student Council was among the stakeholders of the university to condemn the proposal of Duterte Youth Rep. Ducielle Cardema to Department of National Defense to abrogate its 1990 accord with the university, a day after the abrogation of its 1989 accord with the University of the Philippines. The accord stated that the police and military forces must give prior notification to the university president before conducting any operation on any PUP branches and campuses. Central Student Council President Jonero Dacula and PUP Board of Regents student representative Ellenor Bartolome submitted a position paper to Cardema opposing the termination of the PUP-DND agreement. In their position paper, Dacula and Bartolome highlighted a key provision in the PUP-DND accord, which recognized the right of all students “to freely advocate their ideas on the campus with utmost tolerance, understanding and guarantee, without fear of interference and intervention or repression from the state, or any of its agencies and instrumentalities.”

SAMASA PUP (2021 - present) 
In September 2021, Miss Trans Global 2021's Duchess Global Albiean Revalde, an engineering student, was elected as the first transwoman president of the Central Student Council; and Sandigan ng Mag-aaral para sa Sambayanan (SAMASA) becomes the ruling political party of the PUP Student Council once again after five years.

A  day after the International Human Rights Day in 2021, the Central Student Council declared the National Task Force to End Local Communist Armed Conflict (NTF-ELCAC) and Hands Off Our Children Movement (HOOCM) persona non grata in the university after claiming the NTF-ELCAC's "records of baseless red-tagging and HOOCM being an enabler in silencing progressive youths through a facade of psycho-social services."

In April 2022, the Central Student Council endorsed the presidential bid of Vice President Leni Robredo, vice presidential bid of senator Kiko Pangilinan, senatorial bids of  Chel Diokno, Risa Hontiveros, Neri Colmenares, Leila de Lima, Luke Espiritu, Teddy Baguilat, Elmer Labog, Sonny Matula, Alex Lacson, and Carmen Reyes Zubiaga, and congressional bid of Kabataan Partylist. It believed that Robredo and Pangilinan are "the best option to prevent a possible resurgence of a Marcos and a Duterte", who they insisted to have been historically proven as "murderous, corrupt, and self-serving." Both Robredo and Pangilinan would eventually lose the national election to both Bongbong Marcos and Sara Duterte, respectively.

In October, 2022 several student leaders across the universities in the Philippines including the PUP's Sentral na Konseho ng mga Mag-aaral called for the reconsideration of  mandatory Reserve Officers' Training Corps (ROTC) in the schools. The incumbent vice president of the student council, Benhur Queqqegan said  "ROTC would only be a financial burden to students and waste taxpayers' money."

Composition

Student Council Assembly
The Student Council Assembly is the highest policy-making body of the PUP Student Council. It is composed of the president, vice-president, secretary-general, and treasurer of the Central Student Council and presidents of the student councils of various colleges in the university.

Central Student Council

College Departments Student Council Presidents

List of presidents

The president of the Central Student Council is the chief executive officer and overseer of the PUP Student Council and the presiding officer of the Student Council Assembly.

References

Polytechnic University of the Philippines
Students' unions in the Philippines
Student organizations in the Philippines